= Atuba Park =

Park in Curitiba, Brazil

Coordinates: 25°22′49″S 49°12′26″W

Atuba Park is a park located in Curitiba, state of Paraná, Brazil.
